Drasteria walshi is a moth of the family Erebidae. It is endemic to the Pinaleño Mountains and Chiricahua Mountains in southern Arizona. The length of the forewings is 19–23 mm. Adults are on wing from May to June.

References

External links

walshi
Endemic fauna of Arizona
Moths of North America
Chiricahua Mountains
Pinaleño Mountains
Moths described in 2009